The Hague Academic Coalition (HAC) is a consortium of academic institutions in the fields of international relations, international law and international development.

Members and Organization
The member institutions are:
Carnegie Foundation
The Hague Academy of International Law
Hague Institute for the Internationalisation of Law (HiiL)
International Institute of Social Studies of Erasmus University Rotterdam (ISS)
Leiden University Campus The Hague
Netherlands Institute of International Relations 'Clingendael'
The Hague University of Applied Sciences
T.M.C. Asser Instituut

The board of the Hague Academic Coalition consists of:
Prof. Dr. J. de Vries (Campus The Hague) - President
Mr. S. van Hoogstraten (Carnegie Foundation) - Vice President
Prof. Dr. L.J. de Haan (ISS) - Treasurer
Drs. A.S. Gerards (Hague Academic Coalition) - Secretary
Dr. A.S. Muller (HiiL)
Mr. R.K. Brons (The Hague University of Applied Sciences)
Prof. Dr. J. Colijn (Clingendael) 
Mrs. A. O'Brien (T.M.C. Asser Instituut)
Mr. F.W.H. van den Emster (Raad voor de Rechtspraak) - In an advisory capacity

Current programmes and activities
The Hague Forum for Judicial Expertise (HFJE), providing high level training to judges, magistrates and prosecutors.
The Hague Justice Portal (HJP), providing up to date information about the activities of international courts, tribunals and other international organisations based in The Hague.
A programme aimed at the digitalisation of the historic jurisprudence of the Permanent Court of Arbitration. 
Its annual conferences entitled "From Peace to Justice", focusing on specific subjects related to international law, peace and justice
Regular HAC lectures: public lectures aimed at enhancing the discussion in The Hague on topics related to peace and justice

References

External links 

The Hague Academic Coalition on The Hague Justice Portal
Website The Hague Forum for Judicial Expertise 
Website Hague Justice Portal

Social sciences organizations
Organisations based in The Hague